The 2014 Malaysia Super Series Premier was the second super series tournament of the 2014 BWF Super Series. The tournament took place in Kuala Lumpur, Malaysia from January 14–19, 2013 and had a total purse of $500,000. A qualification was held to fill four places in all five disciplines of the main draws.

Men's singles

Seeds

Top half

Bottom half

Finals

Women's singles

Seeds

Top half

Bottom half

Finals

Men's doubles

Seeds

Top half

Bottom half

Finals

Women's doubles

Seeds

Top half

Bottom half

Finals

Mixed doubles

Seeds

Top half

Bottom half

Finals

References

2014 Malaysia Super Series
Super Series
Malaysia Super Series
Malaysia Super Series
Sport in Kuala Lumpur